Water Valley is a home rule-class city in Graves County, Kentucky, United States. The population was 235 as of the 2020 census.

Geography
Water Valley is located at  (36.566559, -88.810928).

Demographics

As of the census of 2000, there were 316 people, 141 households, and 90 families residing in the city. The racial makeup of the city was 94.94% White, 4.75% African American, 0.32% from other races. Hispanic or Latino of any race were 0.32% of the population.

There were 141 households, out of which 29.1% had children under the age of 18 living with them, 50.4% were married couples living together, 9.9% had a female householder with no husband present, and 35.5% were non-families. 34.8% of all households were made up of individuals, and 18.4% had someone living alone who was 65 years of age or older. The average household size was 2.24 and the average family size was 2.84.

In the city, the population was spread out, with 24.1% under the age of 18, 7.6% from 18 to 24, 26.3% from 25 to 44, 23.7% from 45 to 64, and 18.4% who were 65 years of age or older. The median age was 40 years. For every 100 females, there were 89.2 males. For every 100 females age 18 and over, there were 83.2 males.

The median income for a household in the city was $26,071, and the median income for a family was $33,750. Males had a median income of $27,361 versus $17,500 for females. The per capita income for the city was $14,387. About 17.5% of families and 21.1% of the population were below the poverty line, including 37.2% of those under age 18 and 14.3% of those age 65 or over.

References

Cities in Graves County, Kentucky
Cities in Kentucky
Populated places disestablished in 2016